Thecacoris is a genus of flowering plant belonging to the  family Phyllanthaceae first described as a genus in 1821. It is native to tropical Africa and Madagascar. It is dioecious, with male and female flowers on separate plants, although it may rarely be monoecious.

Species

formerly included
moved to other genera: Maesobotrya Spondianthus 
 Thecacoris glabrata - Maesobotrya glabrata  
 Thecacoris trillesii - Spondianthus preussii subsp. glaber

References

Phyllanthaceae
Phyllanthaceae genera
Flora of Africa
Dioecious plants